Pete S. Mueller is an American cartoonist and voice actor. His cartoons have appeared in the New Yorker, Chicago Reader, Reader's Digest, and Funny Times, among other publications.

Mueller is noted for his work with the news satire organization, The Onion, which he began his association with around 1989. In 1999, he began writing material and providing the voice for The Onion Radio News' fictional newsreader, Doyle Redland. Mueller also provided narration for the audiobook version of The Onion book, Our Dumb Century. The photograph of Doyle Redland featured in The Onion publications is not of Mueller.

Mueller was laid off from The Onion in 2010. According to Mueller, while The Onion Radio News has remained popular, "The Onion, Inc. was unable to sell ads to maintain it through [spring 2009], and at the end of 2009, Mr. Redland was folded up and saved for later."

In 2004, Mueller published a collection of his cartoons, Your Belief System Is Shot: Cartoons and Stuff. He lives in the Madison, Wisconsin area.

References

External links 
 
The Onion Radio News
Your Belief System Is Shot from Jones Books
An interview with P.S. Mueller, on NPR's Talk of the Nation

Living people
American cartoonists
American male voice actors
The New Yorker people
Year of birth missing (living people)